The RBSF or the Royal Belgium Yachting Federation is the national governing body for the sport of sailing in Belgium, recognised by the World Sailing.

Notable sailors
See :Category:Belgian sailors

Olympic sailing
See :Category:Olympic sailors of Belgium

Offshore sailing
See :Category:Belgian sailors (sport)

References

External links
 Official website
 ISAF MNA Microsite

Belgium
Sailing
Sailing
Organisations based in Belgium with royal patronage